<noinclude>

Benjamin Kennedy (born 14 February 1987) is an Australian professional soccer goalkeeper who plays for Lambton Jaffas in the National Premier Leagues Northern NSW.

Club career

Newcastle Jets
Kennedy was a train-on player for the Newcastle Jets, but was brought into the full squad for the 2006–07 season. Until half-way through the season, Newcastle only had the inexperienced Kennedy as a registered goalkeeper in their squad, until former Socceroo Ante Covic joined the squad.

Kennedy became the Jets first-choice goalkeeper for the 2009–10 season thanks to some strong performances in the 2009 AFC Champions League, after the departure of Ante Covic to Sweden. However, he was criticised by his coach Branko Čulina for poor performances during the season and making mistakes that cost the Jets vital points.

He was replaced as Newcastle's first choice keeper by Neil Young, due to impressive performances by the 30-year-old. Young was injured when he broke his nose and Kennedy came back into the team. Kennedy was the hero in the finals match against Gold Coast United, making crucial saves throughout the game and saving two penalties, in a game that Newcastle won 6–5.

Kennedy started the 2014–15 season as 2nd choice keeper to Mark Birighitti. He made his season debut in Round 8, and his no.1 spot was cemented when Mark Birighitti left temporarily due to a 6-month loan deal at Italian Serie B club A.S. Varese. In the Jet's Round 27 clash away to the Brisbane Roar, Kennedy produced a number of great saves to deny Brisbane going 5–0 up in the first half. Despite this, the Jets were downed 2–1 due to goals from Kofi Danning and Lachlan Jackson, but Kennedy's performance was rewarded with a place in the Team of the Week. Kennedy made a total of 84 saves, only being outnumbered by rival custodian Liam Reddy.

Central Coast Mariners
After 10 years at the Newcastle Jets, Kennedy joined their F3 Derby rivals Central Coast Mariners on a one-year deal in June 2017. He made his A-League debut for the Mariners in a 0–0 draw away to Brisbane Roar in November that year replacing the injured Tom Glover in the team.

Career statistics

CS = Clean Sheets

1 – includes A-League final series statistics
2 – includes FIFA Club World Cup statistics; AFC Champions League statistics are included in season closing during group stages (i.e. ACL 2009 and A-League season 2008–09 etc.)

Personal life
Kennedy is in a relationship with Samantha Poolman, the Giants Netball player. They share a home in East Maitland

Honours
Newcastle Jets:
 A-League Championship: 2007–08

References

External links
 Newcastle Jets profile
 FFA – Olyroos profile

1987 births
Living people
Sportsmen from New South Wales
Soccer players from New South Wales
Australian soccer players
Australia under-20 international soccer players
Newcastle Jets FC players
Central Coast Mariners FC players
A-League Men players
Association football goalkeepers